Rafael da Silva Floro (born 19 January 1994) is a Portuguese professional footballer who plays for Finnish club AC Oulu as a left back.

Club career
Born in Quarteira, Algarve, Floro played youth football with six clubs, including local C.D.R. Quarteirense from ages 8 to 13. He finished his development with FC Porto and, although he was selected to some Segunda Liga matches by the B team to kickstart his senior career, he could never appear in the competition.

In summer 2013, Floro went on trial with English Football League Championship side Sheffield Wednesday, which had all of their full-backs injured, and signed a one-year contract on 6 August after impressing. That same day, he made his professional debut, being replaced midway through the second half of a 2–1 away loss against Rotherham United in the first round of the League Cup. His first league game took place on the 10th, when he played the first half of another 1–2 defeat, now at home to Burnley.

On 10 May 2015, after no further competitive appearances for the Owls, Floro was released. Shortly after, he returned to his country and joined Primeira Liga club C.F. Os Belenenses on a four-year deal. He also failed to play one single competitive match with the latter, being loaned to teams in the lower leagues.

Floro returned to the Portuguese second tier on 31 January 2017, penning a two-and-a-half-year contract with Gil Vicente F.C. after leaving Louletano DC. He continued to compete in that league but also the third, having abroad spells in Lithuania with FC Stumbras and FK Panevėžys and in Finland with AC Oulu.

International career
In May 2014, Floro was picked by coach Ilídio Vale for his Portuguese under-20 squad which was due to appear in that year's Toulon Tournament. He made four appearances during the competition, helping his team to a final third position.

Career statistics

Club

References

External links

1994 births
Living people
People from Loulé
Sportspeople from Faro District
Portuguese footballers
Association football defenders
Liga Portugal 2 players
Campeonato de Portugal (league) players
FC Porto B players
C.F. Os Belenenses players
Casa Pia A.C. players
S.R. Almancilense players
Louletano D.C. players
Gil Vicente F.C. players
C.D. Cova da Piedade players
F.C. Felgueiras 1932 players
S.C. Olhanense players
English Football League players
Sheffield Wednesday F.C. players
A Lyga players
FC Stumbras players
FK Panevėžys players
Veikkausliiga players
AC Oulu players
Portugal youth international footballers
Portuguese expatriate footballers
Expatriate footballers in England
Expatriate footballers in Lithuania
Expatriate footballers in Finland
Portuguese expatriate sportspeople in England
Portuguese expatriate sportspeople in Lithuania
Portuguese expatriate sportspeople in Finland